Anthony Paul Meindl (born January 14, 1968) is an American director, screenwriter, stage and film actor, author, comedian, and founder and artistic director of Anthony Meindl's Actor Workshop, (otherwise known as AMAW) in Los Angeles. The workshop has since expanded to locations in Atlanta, Chicago, London, Sydney, New York City, Toronto, Cape Town, Santa Fe, Copenhagen and Vancouver.

Early career
In the 1990s, Meindl starred in Hard Hat Harry, a show aimed at introducing children to trucks, cars, construction equipment, and other vehicles.

He moved from New York to Los Angeles in 1997 where he was featured in many commercials for products and companies including Diet Coke, Philips Electronics, Bank of America, Nissan, Michelob Lite, Sears, Acura, Del Taco, Mervyns, and Behr Paint.

He has also appeared in Off-Broadway stage productions of Titus Andronicus, Merrily We Roll Along, and the LA Weekly Award-nominated Cabaret.

He is openly gay. His feature film credits are almost exclusively gay-related, including the 1997 drama David Searching, the 1998 drama Minor Details, and the 2000 comedy/drama Get Your Stuff. In 2005, he was in the 2005 mystery comedy Death of a Saleswoman. He also appeared in a 1998 episode The Truth About Will & Dogs on Will & Grace.

Filmography

Acting Coach 

He has coached and worked with Shailene Woodley, Chace Crawford, Cory Monteith, Olivia Holt, Ian Harding, Larissa Oleynik, Lorenza Izzo, Logan Paul, Camila Cabello, Jenna Dewan-Tatum, Lucy Fry, Phoebe Dynevor, Pom Klementeiff, Sara Sampaio, and Ming XI.

Anthony Meindl's Actor Workshop claims to be different than any other acting studio because of "Tony's Philosophy" focusing on trusting that you are enough and have something to contribute as you.

The "In The Moment" Podcast about acting, art, and life has interviews with casting directors, actors, and industry professionals.

Director/Producer 

Meindl's first feature screenplay, The Wonder Girls, was the Grand Prize Winning Feature Screenplay in the Slamdance Film Festival Screenplay Competition in 2007.
He was nominated for Best Director for the LA Weekly Awards two years in a row for Best Comedy (Swimming In The Shallows), and Best Drama (Dogs Barking). The casts for both shows (members of MetaTheatre Company, his acting studio) were also nominated for Best Ensemble in a Comedy and Best Ensemble in a Drama.

His first short, Ready? OK!, played in over a dozen International Film Festivals, winning numerous "Best of" Awards and premiered on MTV's LOGO Network in 2009 as part of their "Click List:  Best In Short Film Series." It won the 2008 Planet Out Scion Viewer's Choice Short Film Awards.

The first feature film he directed, Birds of A Feather (2011)  won him Best Director awards at the 2012 Downtown LA Film Festival and the 2013 Golden Door Film Festival and the Spirit of the Festival Award at the 2012 Honolulu Rainbow Film Festival. The film features Academy Award winner, Olympia Dukakis, Bruce Vilanch and Trevor Donovan.

Meindl wrote and directed Where We Go From Here (2019) depicting issues of immigration, gun violence, and love in the modern world. It premiered at Outfest in 2018 and was acquired by Hulu.

In 2019, Meindl directed the short Is This You, Too?, which stars and was written by Barbara Howlin.

Authorship 

Anthony Meindl is the author of five books: the best-selling creativity book At Left Brain Turn Right, a spiritual self-help book Alphabet Soup For Grown-Ups, Book the F#©king Job! and Book the F#©king Job for Teens and his memoir which was released Fall 2020, You Knew When You Were 2.

He is also a regular contributor to The Huffington Post, The Daily Love, and Backstage.

References

External links

1968 births
Living people
American male film actors
American male musical theatre actors
American male television actors
American gay actors
People from La Porte, Indiana
21st-century LGBT people